World of Warships is a free-to-play naval warfare-themed multiplayer online game, developed, produced and published by Wargaming. Players can battle others at random or play cooperative battle types against bots or an advanced player versus environment (PvE) battle mode. For the most skilled players, two seasonal competitive modes are also available. The free-to-play structure is of the "freemium" type. Significant progress can be made without purchasing anything, but access to higher levels of play and additional warships becomes progressively more difficult without financial investment.

World of Warships was originally released for Microsoft Windows in 2015. The computer version was followed by the iOS and Android mobile game titled World of Warships Blitz in 2018. The PlayStation 4 and Xbox One console versions, titled World of Warships: Legends, followed in 2019 and were released on the PlayStation 5 and Xbox Series X/S in April 2021.

Gameplay

World of Warships is a tactical, slow-paced shooter with three basic types of armament: ship artillery, torpedoes, and aircraft. The gameplay is team-based, and allows players to work as a team. Within a team, divisions can be established to allow a group of up to three players to join and fight battles together. The player's team can fight against other players (PvP) or against the AI (PvE) in several battle types.

Co-op battles feature a team of players facing off against a team of AI-controlled bots, usually 9v9. Credit and experience rewards earned in co-operative play are notably lower than those earned in Random Battles (PvE), which are the most popular battle type in World of Warships. In Random Battles, captains are dropped into a game with other players according to the matchmaking system, with a majority of these being 12v12 battles. Scenarios pit a team of players against increasingly difficult waves of AI-controlled opponents in operations with unique objectives. In scenarios, players are allowed to queue solo, but are encouraged to gather their friends into a division; assembling a full division of 7 players will greatly increase the chances of success.

Ranked Battles are a seasonal battle type and have restrictions to certain tiers of ships (usually from tier VI-X). A season of Ranked Battles is divided into sprints with a duration of 1–3 weeks each and comprises three Leagues - Bronze, Silver and Gold. Ranked Battles involve players progressing up a ladder-style ranking system in each League from a low rank (such as "Rank 10") towards a high rank, with Rank 1 being the pinnacle of the ladder. Clan Battles are a special battle type, only available at specific times and restricted to certain tiers of ships. A team is formed from within a single Clan by at least one officer.

Brawls are a specific battle type that have a shorter duration of several days, but long availability during the day. Brawls are held in small formats such as 1v1 or 3v3, and support participating either solo or in a division. The Training Room allows players to generate fully custom scenarios on a map of their choice, choosing the duration of the game, the team configurations, and even the exact number of ships on each team. Unbalanced teams are allowed.

The game also has four basic game modes, which may occur with any of the battle types. Standard battles, a classic game mode involving teams, each with their own base; Domination, which features several key areas on the map that grant points when captured; Arms Race, which focuses on improving the characteristics of the player's ships by capturing key areas; and Epicenter, which includes a large area of concentric circles at the center of the map (and in some maps other key areas) where the objective is to capture and hold the entire central area.

The warships presented in the game cover periods from the early 20th century, at the dawn of dreadnought battleships, up to warships from the 1950s, including many ships that were planned but never put into production. The game has four different types of ships that each offer their own style of play: destroyers, cruisers, battleships, and aircraft carriers. Submarines have been added to the game as part of testing as of update 0.9.4. The game features navies of major naval powers including the United States Navy, the Imperial Japanese Navy, the Royal Navy, the French Marine Nationale, the Imperial German Navy (later Kriegsmarine), the Italian Regia Marina and the Imperial Russian Navy (later the Red Fleet). Dutch, Commonwealth, Pan-European (mainly Swedish), and other smaller European navies are also represented, along with a Pan-Asian tree featuring ships from various East and Southeast Asian navies, and a Pan-American nation featuring ships from the navies of the South American countries (such as Brazil and Argentina).

For game purposes, each ship is placed in a tier to facilitate balanced matchmaking. There are ten tiers; Tier I is the lowest and Tier X is the highest. With a few exceptions, each nation has a tech tree; smaller navies with one branch and larger navies with branches for each type and a ship of each type at most tiers. In some cases branches split, such as into heavy and light cruisers. The lowest tier for each tech tree ship type varies; cruisers at Tier I, destroyers at Tier II, battleships at Tier III, and aircraft carriers at Tier IV. There are also premium ships that are outside the tech tree; these are available for cash and/or in-game resources. Tier I is essentially a tutorial mode; only one ship of each navy is available in the game at that tier. These ships are classed as cruisers in the game, but historically some were classed as gunboats, avisos, or frigates, and all are from the WWII era. They feature a small number of 102mm to 152mm guns and relatively slow speed. Tier I is unique in that no other tiers are included in their matchmaking, and none of them have torpedoes. Tiers II through X include ships of increasing combat capability, generally following the chronological development of each ship type in each navy, beginning circa 1905–1910 and ending in the 1950s. Ships that were never completed or begun, also called "paper ships", are used to fill gaps in the tech tree and explore hypothetical developments. Most Tier X ships, most Russian and French ships, and all of the German aircraft carriers (Graf Zeppelin reached a late stage of construction but never entered service) are in this category.

Players can progress through the game via the research and purchase of ships from each tier. Each specific ship has a number of modules that can be accessed through experience. This experience is used to unlock modules, which can then be purchased with credits and mounted. Once a ship's modules are completely researched (credit purchase is not required), the player can acquire the next ship in the tree by spending experience and credits. The previous ship, if fully upgraded, gains "Elite" status, meaning most of its subsequently earned experience can be converted to free experience by spending doubloons (which are primarily acquired via cash purchases). On any ship, warship elements such as commanders with skill trees and unique perks can be customized, as well as modification kits and consumables such as signals and ship camouflage.

The game features combat missions, challenges, campaigns and collections for the sake of creating extra goals, rewards and a meaningful progression for players during their time with the game. These systems also give an opportunity of creating stories inside or outside the military or historical genres. Some special Halloween, April Fools, and other holiday battle modes appear in the game. The secondary goal of the "holiday modes" is to test new game mechanics. Temporary anime tie-in events have occurred, featuring ships and characters (as ship commanders) from High School Fleet, Azur Lane, and Arpeggio of Blue Steel. Other events have used science-fiction-themed ships and environments, but not tied to a specific franchise.

Battles take place on a limited number of specific maps, each depicting a certain location with different geographical layouts, usually featuring numerous islands of varying size that influence play. Most maps have a static or dynamic weather system to make battles more diverse. Moreover, some maps are unique for a certain game mode, e.g. PvE scenario battles based on historical events such as the Dunkirk evacuation.

Scenarios is a PvE game mode where players cooperate and complete tasks. They include a number of operations, each with separate stories, objectives, secondary objectives and rewards. Tasks include not only destroying enemy vessels but also bombarding shore installations, escorting convoys, or preventing enemy vessels from entering or escaping certain areas. To finish the scenario, players need to team up and complete the primary objective. On completion of the secondary objectives, they receive an additional star.

In addition to Ranked Battles, Clan battles were introduced as another competitive mode that is played in the season format. Players can only participate in Clan Battles as a team, as opposed to Ranked battles where individual players compete against each other.

A clan is a group of "teamed" players who either apply or are invited. Also, a bonus resource, oil, can be awarded and contributed to the clan. The commanders (owners) of the group can use this to build and upgrade fleet buildings, which give bonuses to every player in the clan.

Release

On August 16, 2011, the company website of Wargaming, developer and publisher of World of Tanks and World of Warplanes, announced World of Battleships, a free-to-play naval action MMO, intended to complete the World of war trilogy developed by the company. On August 2, 2012, the game was renamed World of Warships. After a petition opened by South Korean players was signed 40,000 times, Wargaming removed the Rising Sun Flag from Imperial Japanese warships in July 2013. After that, more than 12,000 signatures were gathered requesting reimplementation of the Rising Sun Flag, but the decision was not overturned. On November 14, 2013, the game entered closed alpha testing.

Closed beta testing for World of Warships started on March 12, 2015, shortly after closed alpha ended, with the non-disclosure agreement covering the alpha being lifted at the same time. On April 9, 2015, pre-order packages consisting of premium warships and access to the closed beta test became available for purchase by players. Open beta testing for World of Warships started on July 2, 2015, as the final step prior to the game's formal launch. As of the open beta test, approximately 85% of the core game development have been completed and there were future plans to introduce weather effects and night battle after the game's official release.

On September 3, 2015, Wargaming announced that the game had exited open beta. The game was officially launched on September 17, 2015, and later released through Steam and the Microsoft Store on November 15, 2017.

An iOS and Android version titled World of Warships Blitz was released by Wargaming Mobile on January 18, 2018. A console version of the computer game, World of Warships: Legends, was announced on June 20, 2018, and was released in Early Access and Game Preview for the PlayStation 4 and Xbox One on April 16, 2019. World of Warships: Legends fully released on August 12, 2019.

World of Warships: Legends was rebuilt to support console gameplay, sharing the same core gameplay loop of the computer version. However, it was designed to have faster-paced battles, faster progression, and had several systems revamped to fit console players.

According to Malik Khatazhaev, the general manager of Lesta Studio (the branch of Wargaming that develops World of Warships), in May 2019 World of Warships Monthly Active Users (MAU) exceeded 1,000,000 worldwide active players.

Reception

World of Warships has a score of 81/100 on Metacritic. IGN awarded it a score of 8.3 out of 10, stating that the combat feels good and that the game's teamwork is satisfying. GameSpot awarded it a score of 8.0 out of 10, saying "The thrills that await, along with the promise of unlocking advanced ships down the road, make World of Warships an enticing expedition into the sometimes turbulent waters of free-to-play games." The Escapist awarded it four out of five, saying "With its tense naval battles and huge array of historical vessels, World of Warships is the free-to-play MMO that can make a wargamer out of anyone."

Awards

References

External links

  
 (Legends)
 (Blitz)
Official wiki

2015 video games
Massively multiplayer online games
Free-to-play video games
IOS games
Naval video games
PlayStation 4 games
PlayStation 5 games
Video games developed in Russia
Video games with cross-platform play
Wargaming.net games
World War I video games
World War II video games
Windows games
Xbox One games
Xbox Series X and Series S games
Lesta Studio games